Les Galeries Chagnon is an enclosed regional shopping mall in Lévis, Quebec, Canada. It opened in 1974.

After its opening in 1974, it was expanded in 1985 and renovated in 2000 and 2006. In 2008, the Westcliff Group purchased the property from Cadillac Fairview.

According to a 2006 study, the mall was one of six regional or larger malls in the Quebec metropolitan area, but the only one located south of the Saint Lawrence River. In 2012, the mall had 4.8 million visitors.

Anchor tenants
Renaud-Bray
Sports Experts/Atmosphere
Walmart

References

External links
 

Buildings and structures in Lévis, Quebec
Shopping malls established in 1974
Shopping malls in Quebec
Tourist attractions in Chaudière-Appalaches